Mazin Ahmed Al-Huthayfi (born 29 July 1985) is a retired Saudi Arabian footballer. He last played for Oud-Heverlee Leuven in the Belgian Pro League.

Al-Huthayfi was previously loaned out by Ittihad FC to Staines Town, Hampton & Richmond Borough, Portsmouth, Fortuna Düsseldorf and Oud-Heverlee Leuven. He also had a long trial spell at FC Groningen in 2012.

References

External links

1985 births
Living people
Saudi Arabian footballers
Staines Town F.C. players
Hampton & Richmond Borough F.C. players
Portsmouth F.C. players
Fortuna Düsseldorf players
Al-Huthayfi, Mazin Ahmed
Al-Huthayfi, Mazin Ahmed
Al-Huthayfi, Mazin Ahmed
Expatriate footballers in England
Expatriate footballers in Poland
Expatriate footballers in Germany
Saudi Arabian expatriate sportspeople in England
Saudi Arabian expatriate sportspeople in Poland
Saudi Arabian expatriate sportspeople in Germany
Saudi Arabian expatriate sportspeople in Belgium
Saudi Arabian expatriate footballers
Sportspeople from Jeddah
Association football forwards